Stomping Grounds is an American travel and boating show produced by Boat Trader and hosted by Ryan McVinney that originally premiered on YouTube on March 5, 2021, followed by the official television release of the first season on various streaming platforms on Apr 4, 2022.

In the show, McVinney travels across America uncovering local boating traditions and on-the-water culture, meeting up with local boaters who share tales of cherished pastimes and legendary lore from their neck of the woods. The series embarks on boating adventures across a diverse range of waterways to capture the essence of America's varied rivers, lakes, bays and oceans. Each episode explores different types of boats and unique watercraft used for various activities, from fishing to water sports, and delves into key features that make certain vessels ideal for their intended purposes.

Pilot Season

The first three episodes travel to Cape Cod, Massachusetts, Florida's Panhandle region and Wilmington, North Carolina visiting with a host of celebrated boaters, including Brian Kelley of Florida Georgia Line, Netflix's Outer Banks creator Jonas Pate, legendary champion powerboat racer Reggie Fountain and many more.

Season 1

Season 1 features more episodes that dive further into American boating traditions as McVinney drops anchor in towns across the country from the Northeast to the Southwest, and the Pacific Northwest up to the great state of Alaska. Episode 6 features sailfishing in Stuart Florida, and the storied past of the historic Treasure Coast while Episode 7 highlights Ernest Hemingway's iconic yacht Pilar and the Wheeler family from Maine who built it for the famous author back in 1934.

Awards

The show was awarded a 2022 Viddy Award for outstanding video creative in the Culture and Lifestyle category for Long Form Videos and received a Neptune Award from the Marine Marketers of America for outstanding video series.

Distribution

The show is distributed by Waypoint TV and airs on SLING, Tubi, Hulu, Samsung TV Plus (Channel 1184), Vizio (Channel 258), Pluto TV (Channel 2205) and Plex (Channel 258).

The series is also now available on Apple TV, Roku, Amazon Fire TV, Samsung TV, LG TV, YouTube, iOS, Android.

References

Travel television series
American travel television series
Documentary television series
American documentary television series
2022 American television series debuts
American action adventure television series
English-language television shows
Television shows set in North Carolina